Paopi 14 - Coptic Calendar - Paopi 16

The fifteenth day of the Coptic month of Paopi, the second month of the Coptic year. On a common year, this day corresponds to October 12, of the Julian Calendar, and October 25, of the Gregorian Calendar. This day falls in the Coptic season of Peret, the season of emergence.

Commemorations

Saints 

 The martyrdom of Saint Panteleimon, the Physician

References 

Days of the Coptic calendar